The Miss Ecuador 1998 was held on March 21, 1998. There were 15 candidates for the national title, the crown passed from Monica Chala from Pichincha to Soraya Hogonaga from same province, but the new Miss Ecuador 1998 was crowned by Jamil Mahuad who was the mayor of the Quito, the future presidential candidate for the 1998 presidential election and the future president of Ecuador. Soraya competed at Miss Universe 1998.

Results

Placements

Special awards

Contestants

Notes

Returns

Last compete in:

1994
 Los Ríos
1996
 Chimborazo

Withdraws

 Azuay
 Imbabura

Miss Ecuador
1998 beauty pageants
Beauty pageants in Ecuador
1998 in Ecuador